Liu Yonghong  is a Chinese cinematographer, based in Beijing. His work was recognized at the 23rd Manaki Brothers International Film Camera Festival, for his work as director of photography on Seafood (2001). As well as at the Buenos Aires International Festival of Independent Cinema, for his work as director of photography on Blind Shaft (2003).

Biography

Liu Yonghong, was born in 1970 in  Luoyang City, Henan Province. He grew up in the aftermath of the Cultural Revolution and during the Reform and Opening Up movement. At 21 Liu went to study architecture at Yangzhou University. After working as an architect for six years he  was awarded a place to study Cinematography at the Beijing Film Academy. Liu graduated in 2000 with a master's degree in Cinematography and Film Theory. He attended the Central Academy of Drama and Television Arts  from 2001 to 2004 and was awarded a Doctorate in Drama and Operatic Studies.

Career

Liu's first work as a cinematographer was on the film There’s a Strong Wind in Beijing, directed by AnQi Ju. The film was featured in the Forum section of the Berlinale Film Festival in 2000. His next film Seafood with director Zhu Wen was also screened at the Berlinale Film Festival in 2002 and won awards in France, Venice, Singapore and Japan. Liu won the ADF Cinematographer Award for Blind Shaft in 2003. Blind Shaft in total won 12 awards and was nominated for six. Grain in Ear won the ACID award at Cannes in 2005. Grain in Ear was described as "exquisitely photographed" particularly Liu's use "multiple passages (doorways, windows, TV screens) within what might seem like a simple, enclosed mise en scene."

Filmography

As cinematographer

As director
 One Day (2014)

References

External links 
 

 Liu Yonghong at the Chinese Movie Database

Beijing Film Academy alumni
Chinese cinematographers
Artists from Luoyang
1970 births
Living people